The Circling Raven Championship is a tournament on the Epson Tour, the LPGA's developmental tour. It has been a part of the tour's schedule since 2020. It is held at Circling Raven Golf Club near Worley, Idaho, owned and operated by the Coeur d'Alene Tribe.

The inaugural tournament in 2020 was cancelled due to the COVID-19 pandemic.

Winners

References

External links

Coverage on Epson Tour website

Symetra Tour events
Golf in Idaho
Kootenai County, Idaho
Recurring sporting events established in 2020
2020 establishments in Idaho